Ville Andreas Larinto (born 11 April 1990) is a Finnish former ski jumper.

Career 

Larinto made his World Cup debut in 2007/08, and picked up his first World Cup points in the Four Hills opener at Oberstdorf, Germany on 30 December 2007, when he finished 29th.

The 2008/09 season was his breakthrough season. He began the season with an impressive 9th-place finish at Kuusamo, and got his first career podium finish one week later in Trondheim, Norway, where he finished second behind Gregor Schlierenzauer.

Larinto claimed his first World Cup victory on 1 December 2010 at Kuopio.

World Cup

Standings

Wins

External links 

1990 births
Living people
Sportspeople from Lahti
Finnish male ski jumpers
20th-century Finnish people
21st-century Finnish people